Vellathooval Dam is a diversion dam built on the Muthirappuzha river in Vellathooval Village of Devikulam of Idukki district in Kerala, India. Water from this dam is diverted through a canal system to the Powerhouse near Panniyar  After the water flow is used to generate hydroelectricity, the water is released back into the river. The dam is one of the major tourist attractions in the Idukki District, Kerala.

Specifications
Latitude : 10⁰ 0′ 39 ” N
Longitude: 77⁰ 01′ 58” E
Panchayath	: Vellathooval	
Village	: Vellathooval
District	: Idukki	
River Basin : Muthirappuzha
River	: Muthirapuzha	
Release from Dam to river : Muthirappuzha	
Year of completion	: 2016	
Name of Project	: Vellathooval Small H E P
Type of Dam	Concrete – gravity
Classification	: Weir
Maximum Water Level (MWL) :	EL 474.80 m
Full Reservoir Level ( FRL)	EL 472.0 m
Storage at FRL:	0.069 Mm3
Height from deepest foundation : 	16 m
Length: 75 m
Spillway : Ungated
Crest Level : 472.00 m
River Outlet : 	1 No. Circular type, 1.00 m dia.

References

Dams in Kerala
Tourism in Kerala
Dams completed in 2016